Suoy is an endangered Pearic language of Cambodia spoken by a decreasing number of people, mainly older adults. It is spoken in Kampong Speu Province and Pursat Province, in the Phumi Krang Trachak area (Ethnologue).

References

Pearic languages
Endangered Austroasiatic languages